The 2000–01 NHL season was the 84th regular season of the National Hockey League. With the addition of the expansion Columbus Blue Jackets and the Minnesota Wild, 30 teams each played 82 games. The Stanley Cup winners were the Colorado Avalanche, who won the best of seven series 4–3 against the New Jersey Devils. The focus of Colorado's Stanley Cup run was on star defenceman Ray Bourque, who was on a quest to win his first Stanley Cup championship in his illustrious 22-year career.

League business
Two expansion teams, the Minnesota Wild and the Columbus Blue Jackets, joined the league at the beginning of the season, increasing the number of NHL teams to 30. The Blue Jackets would join the Central Division, while the Wild would join the Northwest Division. This divisional alignment would remain static until the 2012–13 season, while the league not expand again until the 2017–18 season when the Vegas Golden Knights entered the league. This was the first time the NHL would have a team in Minnesota since the Minnesota North Stars moved to Dallas, Texas in 1993, and the first time for Ohio since the Cleveland Barons merged with the North Stars in 1978.

The Dallas Stars played their final season at the Reunion Arena before moving to the American Airlines Center in 2001.

The four-official system (two referees and two linesmen) becomes mandatory for all games. It was used only for selected regular season games in 1998–99 and 1999–2000, but was used for all playoff games in both seasons.

The NHL opened the season in Tokyo, Japan with two games between the Nashville Predators and the Pittsburgh Penguins.

Uniform changes
Buffalo: New Red Alternates. 

Calgary: Previous Black Alternates become the new road uniforms.

Carolina: Black outline added to players' names.

Chicago: 75th-anniversary patch. 

Colorado: 2001 NHL All-Star Game Patch. 

Columbus: White Jerseys with red and blue stripes, Blue road jerseys have Red stripe. Team also wears an inaugural season patch. Alt marks are on the shoulders.

Detroit: 75th-anniversary patch

Minnesota: White Jerseys with red and green stripes, the Green jerseys have just the red stripe. Alt marks are on the shoulders.

New York Rangers: 75th-anniversary patch.

Ottawa: The team introduces a new alternate jersey -- this one black with the forward-looking centurion crest.

Pittsburgh: The Penguins introduce a new alternate jersey, welcoming back the skating penguin and introducing Vegas gold.

San Jose: 10th Anniversary patch.

Toronto: Alternates from 1998 to 1999 return, as well as a new TML Patch. 

Washington: Black alternates from 1999 to 2000 become new road uniforms.

Regular season
On December 27, 2000, Mario Lemieux returned from his three-and-a-half-year retirement and, in a game nationally televised on Hockey Night in Canada and ESPN National Hockey Night, registered his first assist 33 seconds into the game against the Toronto Maple Leafs. He went on to add a goal and finish with three points, solidifying his return and bringing a struggling Jaromir Jagr back to his elite status, who went on to win his fourth straight Art Ross Trophy, narrowly surpassing Joe Sakic. Despite playing in only 43 games in 2000–01, Lemieux scored 76 points to finish 26th in scoring, finishing the season with the highest points-per-game average that season among NHL players. Lemieux was one of the three finalists for the Hart Memorial Trophy and Lester B. Pearson Award.

The record for most shutouts in a season (set at 160 in 1997–98 and equalled in 1998–99) was eclipsed, as 186 shutouts were recorded.

Final standings

Eastern Conference

Western Conference

Playoffs

Bracket

Awards
The presentation ceremonies were held in Toronto.

All-Star teams

Coaches

Eastern Conference
Atlanta Thrashers: Curt Fraser
Boston Bruins: Mike Keenan
Buffalo Sabres: Lindy Ruff
Carolina Hurricanes: Paul Maurice
Florida Panthers: Duane Sutter
Montreal Canadiens: Michel Therrien
New Jersey Devils: Larry Robinson
New York Islanders: Butch Goring and Lorne Henning
New York Rangers: Ron Low
Ottawa Senators: Jacques Martin
Philadelphia Flyers: Craig Ramsay and Bill Barber
Pittsburgh Penguins: Ivan Hlinka
Tampa Bay Lightning: Steve Ludzik
Toronto Maple Leafs: Pat Quinn
Washington Capitals: Ron Wilson

Western Conference
Mighty Ducks of Anaheim: Guy Charron
Calgary Flames: Don Hay
Chicago Blackhawks: Alpo Suhonen
Colorado Avalanche: Bob Hartley
Columbus Blue Jackets: Dave King
Dallas Stars: Ken Hitchcock
Detroit Red Wings: Scotty Bowman
Edmonton Oilers: Craig MacTavish
Los Angeles Kings: Andy Murray
Minnesota Wild: Jacques Lemaire
Nashville Predators: Barry Trotz
Phoenix Coyotes: Bobby Francis
San Jose Sharks: Darryl Sutter
St. Louis Blues: Joel Quenneville
Vancouver Canucks: Marc Crawford

Player statistics

Regular season

Scoring leaders
Note: GP = Games played; G = Goals; A = Assists; Pts = Points

Leading goaltenders
Wins: Martin Brodeur (42);
Shutouts: Dominik Hasek (11);
GAA: Roman Cechmanek (2.01);
SV%: Marty Turco (.925)

Playoffs

Scoring leaders
Note: GP = Games played; G = Goals; A = Assists; Pts = Points

Milestones

Debuts
The following is a list of players of note who played their first NHL game in 2000–01:
Andrew Raycroft, Boston Bruins
Marty Turco, Dallas Stars
Eric Belanger, Los Angeles Kings
Andreas Lilja, Los Angeles Kings
Lubomir Visnovsky, Los Angeles Kings
Marian Gaborik, Minnesota Wild
Lubomir Sekeras, Minnesota Wild
Rick DiPietro, New York Islanders
Martin Havlat, Ottawa Senators
Miikka Kiprusoff, San Jose Sharks
Brad Richards, Tampa Bay Lightning
Henrik Sedin, Vancouver Canucks
Daniel Sedin, Vancouver Canucks

Last games

The following is a list of players of note who played their last NHL game in 2000–01, listed with their team:

Hat Tricks

See also
2000 in sports
2000 NHL Entry Draft
2000 NHL Expansion Draft
2001 in sports
51st National Hockey League All-Star Game
NHL All-Rookie Team
NHL All-Star Game

References

Notes

External links
Hockey Database
nhl.com

 
1
1